Westhavelland Nature Park is a nature park and reserve in the state of Brandenburg, Germany. It was established on 11 June 1998. The park was designated an IDA International Dark Sky Reserve on 12 February 2014.

References

Nature parks in Brandenburg
Protected areas established in 1998
International Dark Sky Reserves